(E)-Cinnamonitrile is an organic compound approved for use as a fragrance in products such as air fresheners. It has a spicy cinnamon aroma.

Synthetic routes include an aldol-like condensation of benzaldehyde with acetonitrile under alkaline conditions, an elimination reaction of various oximes derived from cinnamaldehyde, and oxidative coupling of benzene to acrylonitrile.

References 

Nitriles
Phenyl compounds